Grangerland is an unincorporated community in east central Montgomery County, Texas, United States. Grangerland is located at the intersection of F.M. 3083 and F.M. 2090, about 30 miles north of Houston and 10 miles southeast of Conroe.

History 
In 1907, Dr. Edwin Granger purchased land in what is now known as "Grangerland" with the intention of starting a community in the area. Dr. Granger and his fellow settlers made their living by farming cotton, selling limited lumber, and cutting railroad ties.

In 1931, during the Texas oil boom, oil was discovered in the area. To accommodate the influx of oil workers, Don D. Granger, Dr. Edwin Granger's son, built a group of houses called, "Granger's Camp." As the area continued to expand in the 1940s and 50s, the area surrounding the camp became known as "Grangerland."

Government 
As an unincorporated community, local administrative responsibilities are managed by Montgomery County, Precinct 4. As of June 2023, the commissioner for Precinct 4 is Matt Gray. Caney Creek Fire and Rescue operates a fire station within the community.

In the Texas State Senate, Grangerland is in District 4, represented by Republican Brandon Creighton. In the Texas House of Representatives, Grangerland is in District 3, represented by Republican Cecil Bell, Jr.

In the United States Senate, the entire state of Texas is represented by Republicans John Cornyn and Ted Cruz. In the United States House of Representatives, Grangerland is in District 8, represented by Republican Morgan Luttrell.

Education  

Grangerland students attend schools in the Conroe Independent School District.

Elementary students (K-4) in south and west Grangerland attend Ben Milam Elementary School.
Elementary students (K-4) in north and east Grangerland attend Creighton Elementary School.
Intermediate students (5-6) attend Grangerland Intermediate School.
Junior High students (7-8) attend Moorhead Junior High School.
High School students (9-12) attend Caney Creek High School.

Residents of Conroe ISD (and therefore Grangerland) are served by the Lone Star College System (formerly North Harris Montgomery Community College).

References

External links
 

Unincorporated communities in Montgomery County, Texas
Unincorporated communities in Texas
Greater Houston